Silent Feet is an album by German double bassist and composer Eberhard Weber recorded in 1977 and released on the ECM label.

Reception
The Allmusic review by Scott Yanow awarded the album 3 stars, stating, "Emphasizing long tones, contrasting sound with silence... This music moves slowly and requires a lot of patience by the listener.

Track listing
All compositions by Eberhard Weber.
 "Seriously Deep" – 17:48 
 "Silent Feet" – 12:10 
 "Eyes That Can See in the Dark" – 12:20

Personnel
Eberhard Weber – bass
Charlie Mariano – soprano saxophone, flute
Rainer Brüninghaus – piano, synthesizer
John Marshall – drums

References

ECM Records albums
Eberhard Weber albums
1978 albums
Albums produced by Manfred Eicher